Aleksandar Petaković (Serbian Cyrillic: Александар Петаковић; 6 February 1930 – 12 April 2011) was a Serbian footballer and manager.

Clubs
 Radnički Beograd (1947–1961)
 Lille OSC (1961–1962)
 Standard Liège (1962–1963)
 Fortuna '54 (1963–1965)

References

External links
 

1930 births
2011 deaths
Footballers from Belgrade
Serbian footballers
Yugoslav footballers
Yugoslavia international footballers
Association football forwards
Yugoslav First League players
Ligue 2 players
Eredivisie players
Belgian Pro League players
FK Radnički Beograd players
OFK Beograd players
Lille OSC players
Standard Liège players
Fortuna Sittard players
Yugoslav expatriate footballers
Serbian expatriate footballers
Expatriate footballers in France
Expatriate footballers in Belgium
Expatriate footballers in the Netherlands
1954 FIFA World Cup players
1958 FIFA World Cup players
Serbian football managers
Yugoslav football managers
İzmirspor managers